Suzdaly is a rural locality (a village) in Zabolotskoye Rural Settlement, Permsky District, Perm Krai, Russia. The population was 275 as of 2010. There are 6 streets.

Geography 
Suzdaly is located 44 km southwest of Perm (the district's administrative centre) by road. Gorshki is the nearest rural locality.

References 

Rural localities in Permsky District